WIFX is a Hot Adult Contemporary formatted broadcast radio station licensed to Jenkins, Kentucky, serving Southeastern Kentucky and Southwestern Virginia. WIFX is owned and operated by Gearhart Communications.

History
The station went on the air as WREM-FM on May 10, 1975. As a newly launched companion station for WREM-AM (AM 1000, now WKVG), it originally broadcast a variety format. 

On November 23, 1981, the station changed its call sign to the current WIFX. It began airing a Top 40 format the same year. Sometime later in that decade, it began airing its current Hot AC format. 

In May 2013, the station launched "Foxy and Friends", a local morning show to replace John Boy and Billy, which was moved to a sister station. "Foxy and Friends" broadcasts live, weekday mornings from 6-9 AM and currently features hosts Tiffany, Tim, and Jake.

References

External links
 Foxy 94-3 Online
 

IFX-FM
Jenkins, Kentucky
1975 establishments in Kentucky
Radio stations established in 1975